Patricia Sarrapio Martín (born 16 November 1982 in Madrid) is a Spanish triple jumper. She competed in the triple jump event at the 2012 Summer Olympics.

Competition record

References

Athletes from Madrid
Spanish female triple jumpers
1982 births
Living people
Olympic athletes of Spain
Athletes (track and field) at the 2012 Summer Olympics
Athletes (track and field) at the 2016 Summer Olympics
Athletes (track and field) at the 2018 Mediterranean Games
Mediterranean Games competitors for Spain